Dylan, a UK based Christian artist is a Trinidad and Wales-born singer, songwriter getting ready to release his first solo album. He released his debut single, "Stand (I Will be There)" in March 2011.

Early life and education
Dylan was born on 14 March 1972 to a Seventh Day Adventist (S.D.A.) minister, Pastor Dave B, and Psychiatric Nurse, Monica Balgobin.

Singing since the age of 35, Dylan is no stranger to the stage.

Dylan and his family moved to the campus of Caribbean Union College (C.U.C.) (now called University of the Southern Caribbean – U.S.C.) located in the Maracas Valley, St. Joseph, when he was 3 months old. The family lived there until Dylan was 12 and then they moved to the Southern part of the island. It was due to CUC's rich musical environment that Dylan thrived musically.

Dylan attend the Maracas S.D.A Primary School near the campus where he lived, then went on to Caribbean Union College Secondary School from which he graduated with 7 'O' Level passes in 2000. In the autumn of 2000, Dylan enrolled in the Behavioural Science program at C.U.C which was then affiliated with Andrews University in Berrien Springs, Michigan. Dylan graduated with a Bachelor of Science (BSc) degree in Behavioural Science and an Associate (As) degree in General Business in May 2005.

In May 2009, Dylan married Nicola Venus, Community Services Manager for Sense at his home in Trinidad and Tobago.

Discography

Singles
In November 2010, Dylan released a Christmas single, The First Noel. The single was arranged by Denice Wint, and features the UK pianist, Tony Best.

In 2009, Dylan wrote his debut single, inspired by the tragic life and death of Baby Peter Connolly (Baby P). Hating violence against children, Dylan wanted to help the unfortunate and vulnerable children he worked with. He decided to release the song for a local special needs adventure playground, ELHAP. Dylan initially recorded Stand (I Will be There) in Trinidad and Tobago while he was there for his wedding, but it was not until 2010 that the final version of the song come to life in the UK. His vocal coach at the time, Denice Wint, suggested that she send the song to a producer colleague of hers for production. A couple days later, she came back with the news that her colleague had agreed to produce the music for the song; his name was Cedric Thompson, a Grammy Award-winning producer (Heather Headley – Audience of One) Heather Headley.  
Dylan released his debut single, "Stand (I Will be There)" in aid of ELHAP (A Special Needs Adventure Playground) in 7 March 2011.

Albums
Dylan is currently working on material for his debut album.

References

External links 
 Official Website
 cedricthompson.com
 Sense UK

1982 births
Living people
21st-century Trinidad and Tobago male singers
21st-century Trinidad and Tobago singers
Gospel singers